Adrion is both a surname and a given name. Notable people with the name include:

Rainer Adrion (born 1953), German footballer and manager
Adrion Pajaziti (born 2002), Kosovan footballer
Adrion Smith (born 1971), American player of Canadian football and announcer

See also
Adrian